The climate of Gujarat involves diverse conditions. The plains of Gujarat are very hot and dry in summer and cold and dry in winter. Summer is milder in the hilly regions and the coast. The monsoon season lasts from June to September. Most of Gujarat receives scanty rainfall. Southern Gujarat and the hilly regions receive heavy rainfall during the monsoons with high humidity which makes the air feel hotter. There is relief when the monsoon season starts (around mid June). Most of the rainfall occurs in this season, and the rain can cause severe Floods. The sun is often occluded during the monsoon season. Though mostly dry, it is desertic in the north-west, and wet in the southern districts due to a heavy monsoon season.

Climate data

References

Climate of India